Ludwig Laqueur (25 July 1839 – 20 April 1909) was a German ophthalmologist born in Festenberg, Silesia. He was the father of historian Richard Laqueur (1881–1959).

He studied medicine in Breslau and Berlin, earning his doctorate in 1860. From 1863 to 1869 he worked as an assistant at Richard Liebreich's ophthalmological hospital in Paris. In 1872 he became an associate professor at the University of Strasbourg, where in 1877 he was appointed a full professor of ophthalmology. Among his assistants at Strasbourg was Paul Silex (1858-1929).

Laqueur is remembered for his research of physostigmine, a chemical substance found in the Calabar bean (Physostigma venenosa) of West Africa.  In 1876 he published Ueber eine neue therapeutische Verwendung des Physostigmin, suggesting the use of physostigmine for the treatment of glaucoma . Laqueur noticed that extracts of the Calabar bean significantly lowered intraocular pressure. He could attest to these results first-hand, because Laqueur suffered from glaucoma, a fact that was kept secret from his medical colleagues until after his death. Laqueur died in Santa Margherita Ligure on 20 April 1909.

Written works 
 Etudes sur les Affections Sympathiques de l'oeil, Paris, 1869
 Ueber eine neue therapeutische Verwendung des Physostigmin, 1876
 Ueber Atropin und Physostigmin in Albrecht von Graefe's Archiv für Augenheilkunde xxiii.
 Das Prodromalstadium des Glaucoms, ib. xxvi.
 Die Lage des Centrums der Macula Lutea im Menschlichen Gehirn in Rudolf Virchow's Archiv clviii.
  "Lateral Illumination" in "System of the Diseases of the Eye" edited by Norris and Oliva, Philadelphia, 1897.

References 
 Ophthalmology's Botanical Heritage at Herbalgram.org
 Hans-Peter Laqueur (Ed.): Louis Laqueur: Aus meinem Leben, Erinnerungen, Nicosia 1997,

External links 
 Jewish Encyclopedia (biography)

German ophthalmologists
Silesian Jews
1839 births
1909 deaths
Academic staff of the University of Strasbourg
People from Twardogóra
People from the Province of Silesia